Zetten-Andelst is a railway station for Zetten and Andelst, Netherlands. The station opened on 1 November 1882 and is on the Elst–Dordrecht railway. Train services are operated by Arriva. The station is situated between the two villages.

Train services

Bus services

External links
NS website 
Arriva website 
Dutch Public Transport journey planner 

Railway stations in Gelderland
Railway stations opened in 1882
Overbetuwe